Gilles Houde (April 23, 1932 – June 14, 2014) was a Canadian politician who served in the National Assembly of Quebec from 1966 to 1976. He represented the electoral district of Fabre as a member of the Quebec Liberal Party.

Prior to his career in politics, Houde worked as a physical education teacher. Following his defeat in the 1976 election, he joined Le Devoir as a sportswriter, and later hosted sports and health programming for both Télévision de Radio-Canada and TVA.

References

External links

1932 births
2014 deaths
Quebec Liberal Party MNAs
Politicians from Montreal
Television personalities from Montreal
Canadian television personalities
Canadian sportsperson-politicians
Canadian sportswriters
Writers from Montreal